The Lions of the Great War is a war memorial in Smethwick, in Sandwell in the West Midlands of England dedicated to the memory of the Sikh soldiers from the British Indian Army who fought in the First World War.  It was unveiled on 4 November 2018 as part of the centenary of the end of the war.  The bronze sculpture is a 10ft high depiction of a Sikh soldier of the First World War on a 5ft granite plinth; it was created by Luke Perry.

The Sikh Soldiers 
The Sikh soldiers contributed the most volunteers of any of the British holdings that had fought in that war. In 1919, India solely produced around 1 to 1.5 million troops for combat.  Among these troops, the Sikhs rallied in large numbers for the King, Empire, and the defence of Europe.

Chattri
The Chattri is a war memorial similar to the Lions of the Great War which is located in the English city of Brighton and Hove. The Chattri was built on the site where Indian soldiers were cremated. The structure is classified as a Grade II listed status, reflecting its significance.

References

National monuments and memorials
Tourist attractions in England
World War I memorials in the United Kingdom